Jean-Louis Dubreton (18 January 1773 – 27 May 1855) enlisted in the French army in 1790 and served during the French Revolutionary Wars where he gained advancement. During the War of the First Coalition he fought against the allies in the north and against the War in the Vendée. By 1801 he commanded a battalion in Italy. The year 1803 found him leading a regiment during the failed French occupation of Santo Domingo.

During the Napoleonic Wars, Dubreton served in Holland and Germany, becoming a general officer in 1811. Later he transferred to Spain where he won fame by leading the defenders during the Siege of Burgos, one of Wellington's rare setbacks. Promoted, he commanded a division at Dresden, Leipzig, and Hanau in the autumn of 1813. King Louis XVIII of France appointed him to several military posts and, in 1819, to the Chamber of Peers, a lawmaking body. Dubreton is one of the names inscribed under the Arc de Triomphe on Column 35.

References
 Gates, David. The Spanish Ulcer: A History of the Peninsular War. London: Pimlico, 2002. 
 Glover, Michael. The Peninsular War 1807-1814. London: Penguin, 2001. 
  Mullié, Charles. Biographie des célébrités militaires des armées de terre et de mer de 1789 a 1850. 1852.
 Smith, Digby. The Napoleonic Wars Data Book. London: Greenhill, 1998. 

1773 births
1855 deaths
People from Ploërmel
French generals
French military personnel of the French Revolutionary Wars
Military personnel of the War in the Vendée
French commanders of the Napoleonic Wars
Order of Saint Louis recipients
Recipients of the Legion of Honour
Names inscribed under the Arc de Triomphe